Have Trumpet, Will Excite! is a 1959 studio album by trumpeter Dizzy Gillespie.

Reception

The Penguin Guide to Jazz rates the album three stars and states that "there's a case for saying that this is one of the best of all Gillespie's small-group albums: the playing has a steely refinement that makes the audacious moments stand out even further, the relatively neutral setting puts a more decisive face on the trumpet choruses, and it's a rare chance to hear Gillespie work through what might have been a hard-bop programme of standard tunes."  Ronnie Lankford's AllMusic review says of the album, "Gillespie and the band, seem to say, "We can play old swing tunes, but wouldn't it be cool if we turned them inside out?" This approach, along with sharp solos, gives the material an exciting edge."

Track listing
 "My Heart Belongs to Daddy" (Cole Porter) – 6:02
 "My Man" (Jacques Charles, Channing Pollack, Albert Willemetz, Maurice Yvain) – 4:19
 "Moonglow" (Eddie DeLange, Will Hudson, Irving Mills) – 6:24
 "St. Louis Blues" (W.C. Handy) – 5:56
 "Woody 'n' You" (Dizzy Gillespie) – 6:23
 "Wrap Your Troubles in Dreams (and Dream Your Troubles Away)" (Harry Barris, Ted Koehler, Billy Moll) – 7:17
 "There Is No Greater Love" (Isham Jones, Marty Symes) – 3:26
 "I Found a Million Dollar Baby (In a Five and Ten Cent Store)" (Al Dixon, Billy Rose, Harry Warren) – 6:59
 "There Is No Greater Love" – 3:29 Bonus track on CD reissue
 "There Is No Greater Love" – 3:35 Bonus track on CD reissue
 "There Is No Greater Love" – 4:02 Bonus track on CD reissue
 "I Found a Million Dollar Baby (In a Five and Ten Cent Store)" – 6:37 Bonus track on CD reissue

Personnel
 Dizzy Gillespie - trumpet
 Junior Mance - piano
 Lex Humphries - drums
 Sam Jones - double bass
 Les Spann - guitar, flute
 Carlos "Patato" Valdes - conga (track 5)

References 

1959 albums
Dizzy Gillespie albums
Albums produced by Norman Granz
Verve Records albums
Albums recorded at CBS 30th Street Studio